Saly Greige is a Lebanese engineer, model and beauty pageant titleholder who was crowned Miss Lebanon 2014. She represented Lebanon at Miss World 2014 and Miss Universe 2014.

Career
Greige studied civil engineering at the University of Balamand. She was crowned as Miss Lebanon 2014 on October 5, 2014. Elsa Hajjar came in the second place and Rouba Monzer won the 2nd runner up. In January 2015, Greige came under criticism in her country for appearing in a photograph with Miss Israel, Doron Matalon, at the Miss Universe pageant in Miami, United States.

In 2017, she became a TV host of Sahtak Bildini at LBCI, then The Insider at Dubai TV in 2019.

Personal life
She married a lawyer, Toni Khouri, in 2015, and had her first child, Ray, in May 2018 in Dubai. In June 2021, she had her second son, James, at Houston Methodist Hospital.

References

1989 births
Living people
People from Koura District
Miss Universe 2014 contestants
Miss World 2014 delegates
Lebanese Christians
University of Balamand alumni